Azem Shkreli (10 February 1938 – 27 May 1997) was an Albanian writer, poet, director and producer. He was head of the Kosovo Writers' Association, manager of the National Theatre of Kosovo (then People`s Provincial Theatre) in Prishtina and founder and manager of Kosovafilm, a film production, distribution and screening company.

Early life 

Azem Shkreli was born on February 10, 1938, in Rugova, Pejë (Kosovo). He lost his mother when he was two years old, and was brought up by his grandmother, who also died when he was a young boy. He went to elementary school in his hometown, and in Prishtina, he attended high school and graduated in 1961, and then went to the Faculty of Philosophy of the University of Prishtina, to study in the Department of Albanian Language and Literature Studies, from which he graduated in 1965. As a student, he began writing for the daily newspaper Rilindja and served as head of the Kosovo Writers' Association. He worked as director of the National Theatre of Kosovo (then People's Provincial Theatre) from 1960 to 1975 and in 1975 he became founder and director of Kosovafilm, a film production, distribution and screening company – a post he held until he was expelled by the new Serb administration in 1991.

References

External links 

1938 births
1997 deaths